Annea may refer to:
 Annea (plant), a genus of plants in the family Fabaceae
 Annea (fish), a fossil genus of sharks in the unidentified family, order Orectolobiformes